Jaya is a feminine given name. It is also found in compound names of both male and female people.

Notable people with this name
Jaya (singer) (born 1971), Filipina pop singer 
Jaya Bachchan (born 1948), Indian actress
Jaya Guhanathan, Indian actress
Jaya Luintel, Nepali journalist
Jaya Prada (born 1962), Indian actress
Jaya Seal, Indian actress
Jaya (Jeevuba)

Derived names
Female
Jayalalithaa (born 1951), Indian actress and politician
Jayamalini (born 1958), Indian actress
Jayasudha (born 1958), Indian actress

Male
Jayakatwang (died 1293), Javanese king killed during the Mongol invasion of Java
Jayaram (born 1965), Indian actor
Jayasimha, multiple people

Fictional characters
Jaya, a character in Avatar: The Legend of Korra that lived during Avatar Wan's time
Jaya Ballard, a character from the Magic: The Gathering card game
Jaya, a character from the book The Iron Ring

See also
Jaya (disambiguation)